Atty. Edwin B. Gastanes (born December 21, 1958) is a Filipino lawyer and sports administrator who is the current general secretary of the Philippine Football Federation and secretary general of the Philippine Olympic Committee.

Gastanes was appointed as general secretary of the Philippine Football Federation (PFF) on February 15, 2013. He was tapped by PFF President Mariano Araneta to help manage the sports body. He was likewise named secretary general of the Philippine Olympic Committee on August 8, 2019.

Early life and Law practice
Gastanes was born on December 21, 1958, in Palawan. He obtained his Bachelors of Laws degree from the University of the Philippines College of Law in 1986. He was in the Top 10 of his class, and was conferred by the Dean's Medal. 

He worked for the law firm Ponce Enrile Reyes & Manalastas Law Offices (PECABAR) as Junior Associate (1987-1989), Senior Associate (1989-1992), Junior Partner (1992-1995), and Senior Partner (1996-2004). 

He is also a Legal practitioner in several areas of law and currently acts as counsel for several select (foreign and domestic) individual and corporate clients.

International Appointments
He was initially appointed as the Member of the AFC Legal Committee for the term 2013 until 2015.  Then he was appointed as the chairman of the ad-hoc AFC Electoral Committee during the 26th AFC Congress held in Manama, Bahrain.  He went on become the Deputy Chairperson of the AFC Legal Committee for the term 2015 to 2019, and currently he sits as Member of the AFC Legal Committee for the term 2019 until 2023. He also served as Alternate Council Member of the AESAN Football Federation for the term 2019 to 2023.

Political Career
Hailing from the province of Palawan, considered as the last frontier of the Philippines, Gastanes made two unsuccessful attempts to get elected as a representative of the province's 2nd district in the House of Representatives, in 2004 and 2022. His platform includes a focus on agriculture and strict regulations of the local mining industry.

References

Filipino sports executives and administrators
People from Puerto Princesa
Year of birth missing (living people)
Living people
Place of birth missing (living people)